So Weird is a television series shot in Vancouver, British Columbia that aired on the Disney Channel as a midseason replacement from January 18, 1999 to September 28, 2001. The series at first centered on teenage girl Fiona "Fi" Phillips (Cara DeLizia) who toured with her rock star mom (Mackenzie Phillips), encountering paranormal activity along the way. Acting as an X-Files for the younger crowd, the series took a darker tone than other Disney Channel Originals. The third and final season, Disney replaced Cara DeLizia (due to her wanting to pursue future projects outside of Disney) with actress Alexz Johnson playing Annie Thelen. The third season also opted for a lighter tone than the previous two to appeal to younger audiences.

Series overview

Episodes

Season 1 (1999)

Season 2 (1999–2000)

Season 3 (2000–01)

References

External links 
 

Lists of Disney Channel television series episodes
Lists of American teen drama television series episodes
Lists of Canadian television series episodes